Szymon Sawala (born September 25, 1982 in Sieraków) is a Polish footballer who plays for GKS Bełchatów in the Ekstraklasa.

Career

Club
In February 2011, he joined GKS Bełchatów on three and a half year contract.

References

External links
 

1982 births
Living people
People from Sieraków
Polish footballers
Amica Wronki players
Polonia Bytom players
Hapoel Nof HaGalil F.C. players
Vyzas F.C. players
Olympiacos Volos F.C. players
GKS Bełchatów players
Ekstraklasa players
Israeli Premier League players
Sportspeople from Greater Poland Voivodeship
Association football midfielders
Expatriate footballers in Israel
Expatriate footballers in Greece
Polish expatriate sportspeople in Israel
Polish expatriate sportspeople in Greece